Desperate But Not Serious is a 1999 film directed by Bill Fishman. It was released in the United States under the title Reckless + Wild.

Plot
Out-of-towner Lily (Taylor) arrives in Los Angeles to attend a wedding reception with the man of her dreams, Jonathan (Corbett). Aided by party-girl Frances (Brewster), they embark on a night of adventure after the wedding invitation is lost. Their wild romp through the streets of Hollywood in search of the reception, takes them to club after club - including the trendy "Vapor" Room and even into the home of famous actor Darby Tipp. After being thrown out of parties, terrorized by a psycho bartender, and chased by police it seems Lily will never find her man - or will she?

Cast
 Christine Taylor as Lili
 Paget Brewster as Frances
 Claudia Schiffer as Gigi
 Judy Greer as Molly
 John Corbett as Jonathan
 Max Perlich as Todd
 Joey Lawrence as Darby 
 Toledo Diamond as Himself 
 Wendie Jo Sperber as Landlady
 Brent Bolthouse as Steve
 Stacy Sanches as Shauna
 John Fleck as Landon Liebowitz
 Zach Tiegan as Justin
 Henry Rollins as Bartender
 Matthew Porretta as Gene
 Sara Melson as Patrice
 Duffy Taylor as Jimmy
 Agnieszka Musiala as Stacy

Production
Claudia Schiffer sang all of the songs performed by her character herself.

Having already had her earlobes pierced shortly beforehand especially for her part in Black & White, Claudia Schiffer had the cartilage in both ears pierced multiple times for her part in this film. She also had her nose and belly button pierced, especially for this film. Following the end of filming, she removed all of the piercings (including her earlobes) and allowed them to close up again.

References

External links

1999 films
1999 drama films
American drama films
Films directed by Bill Fishman
1990s English-language films
1990s American films